The 2007 British Rowing Championships were the 36th edition of the National Championships, held from 20–22 July 2007 at the National Water Sports Centre in Holme Pierrepont, Nottingham. They were organised and sanctioned by British Rowing, and are open to British rowers.

Senior

Medal summary

Lightweight

Medal summary

Coastal

Medal summary

U 23

Medal summary

Junior

Medal summary 

Key

References 

British Rowing Championships
British Rowing Championships
British Rowing Championships